Allan Mørkøre (born 22 November 1971) is a former Faroese professional football midfielder. Now he is a manager for B71 Sandoy, which plays in the men's second best division. He was manager for AB from 2008 to 2010, he replaced Sigfríður Clementsen, who is currently the manager for HB. In 2010, he became manager of B36 Tórshavn. Mørkøre is now assisting coach for FC Hoyvík, which plays in the second best Faroese football division 1. deild. Allan Mørkøre is the younger brother of fellow Faroese international Kurt Mørkøre.

Club career
A strong midfielder and good header of the ball, he started his career at Faroese club KÍ Klaksvík and also played for Tórshavn sides HB and B36 as well in the Icelandic League with ÍBV, later he was playing for AB Argir at the same time as he was manager for the team. Today he plays in FC Hoyvík in 1. deild, he is also the assisting manager of the team and he is also a player of the team.

International career
Mørkøre made his debut for the Faroe Islands in the famous shock defeat of Austria in a September 1990 European championship qualifying match, which was the country's debut in official international competition. His final match was a June 2001 World Cup qualifying match against 
Yugoslavia, coming on as a substitute for Julian Johnsson. He earned 54 caps, scoring 1 goal. He is the fifth most capped player for the Faroe Islands national side.

International goals

Scores and results list Faroe Islands' goal tally first.

References

External links
 
 Allan Mørkøre's manager career on FaroeSoccer.com

1971 births
Living people
Faroese footballers
Faroe Islands international footballers
Íþróttabandalag Vestmannaeyja players
Expatriate footballers in Iceland
Faroese football managers
B36 Tórshavn players
KÍ Klaksvík players
Argja Bóltfelag players
Faroese expatriates in Iceland
People from Klaksvík
Association football midfielders